Jakob Ragnarsson (born September 23, 1999) is an American-born Swedish ice hockey defenceman who plays for Timrå IK of Swedish Hockey League (SHL). He made his SHL debut for Rögle BK at the beginning of the 2019–20 season but was returned to Allsvenskan after dressing for 4 games in which he played only about 3 minutes. He was originally loaned from Rögle BK to Timrå IK but it was later decided that he should sign a contract with Timrå IK.

Ragnarsson  was drafted by the New York Rangers of the NHL in the 3rd round (70th overall) of the 2018 NHL Entry Draft.  His father Marcus Ragnarsson is a former NHL defenseman. Jakob was born in California during his father's time playing for the San Jose Sharks.

References

External links

1999 births

Living people

Almtuna IS players

New York Rangers draft picks
People from Mountain View, California
Rögle BK players
Sportspeople from California
Swedish ice hockey defencemen
Timrå IK players